Juan Manuel Diez Francos (born 15 December 1951) is a Mexican politician affiliated with the Institutional Revolutionary Party (PRI). He served as Deputy of the LXII Legislature of the Mexican Congress representing Veracruz between 31 August 2012 and 23 April 2013.

References

1951 births
Living people
Politicians from Veracruz
Institutional Revolutionary Party politicians
21st-century Mexican politicians
Deputies of the LXII Legislature of Mexico
Members of the Chamber of Deputies (Mexico) for Veracruz